Krzysztof Szafrański (born 21 November 1972 in Prudnik) is a former Polish racing cyclist.

Palmres
2001
3rd National Time Trial Championships
2002
1st Szlakiem Grodów Piastowskich
 National Time Trial Champion

References

1972 births
Living people
Polish male cyclists
People from Prudnik
Sportspeople from Opole Voivodeship
21st-century Polish people